Meddon Moor is a Site of Special Scientific Interest (SSSI) in Cornwall, England. The moor is located in the very north-eastern corner of Cornwall, on the border with Devon, within the civil parish of Morwenstow.

The Meddon Moor SSSI is noted for its biodiversity, and sits on the Carboniferous Culm Measures of North Cornwall. It contains the largest single area of remaining Culm grassland in Cornwall.

See also

 Meddon Green Local Nature Reserve

References

Sites of Special Scientific Interest in Cornwall
Sites of Special Scientific Interest notified in 1992
Conservation in the United Kingdom
Moorlands of England